Akaka Falls State Park is a state park on Hawaii Island, in the U.S. state of Hawaii. Akaka is named after Chief 'Akaka-o-ka-nī'au-oi'o-i-ka-wao, grandson of Kūlanikapele and Kīakalohia. The accessible portion of the park lies high on the right shoulder of the deep gorge into which the waterfall plunges, and the falls can be viewed from several points along a loop trail through the park.

Local folklore describes a stone here called Pōhaku a Pele that, when struck by a branch of lehua āpane, will call the sky to darken and rain to fall.  Lehua āpane or ōhia āpane is an ōhia tree (Metrosideros polymorpha) with dark red blossoms.

Akaka Falls is located on Kolekole Stream.

Wildlife
The oopu alamoo is an endemic Hawaiian species of goby fish that spawns in stream above the waterfall, but matures in the sea.  These fish have a suction disk on their bellies that allows them to cling to the wet rocks behind and adjacent to the waterfall.  Using this disk, they climb back up to the stream when it is time to spawn. A shrimp called the ōpaekalaole has also evolved to climb Akaka Falls and live in Kolekole Stream.

See also
 List of Hawaii state parks
 Umauma Falls
 Rainbow Falls

References

External links

Hiking to the Akaka Falls in Big Island, Hawaii
Photo Essay on Akaka Falls State Park

Protected areas of Hawaii (island)
State parks of Hawaii
Waterfalls of Hawaii (island)
Articles containing video clips